Síofra O’Leary (born 20 September 1968) is an Irish lawyer and judge at the European Court of Human Rights.

Biography
O’Leary was born in Dublin where she completed a Bachelor of Civil Law, University College Dublin in 1989. She went on to study at the European University Institute in Florence, where she received her Ph.D. in European law in 1993. O'Leary then worked in research in the Universities of Cadiz and London before going on to become Assistant Director in the Center for European Law Studies at the University of Cambridge in 1996. O'Leary went on to become a Fellow at Emmanuel College there .

Starting 1996  for three years, O'Leary held the position of Référendaire (consultant) at the Court of Justice of the European Union in Luxembourg. She then became the "Chef de cabinet" from 2000 to 2004. During her time at the court of justice, O'Leary also worked as a visiting fellow at the University of Dublin from 1999 to 2004  and from 2003 she has been a visiting professor at the College of Europe in Bruges. Her lectures addressing practitioners, government agencies and academics on fundamental rights, EU law and European Court of Justice practice and procedure. She writes articles on fundamental rights, EU employment law, the free movement of persons and services and EU citizenship. O'Leary held various positions at the Court of Justice of the European Union until in April 2015 she was elected to replace Ann Power as Ireland's judge at the European Court of Human Rights. Her term began on 2 July 2015 and is expected to end on 1 July 2024. From 1 January 2020 O'Leary has been President of Section. On 15 November 2021 she was elected as the Court's vice president. On 19 September 2022, she was elected President of the Court and became the first woman to hold that position when she took up office on 1 November 2022 replacing Robert Spano who is Icelandic.

Bibliography
 The Evolving Concept of Community Citizenship (Kluwer, 1996) 
 Employment Law at the European Court of Justice (Hart Publishing, 2001)

References and sources

1968 births
Living people
Lawyers from Dublin (city)
Presidents of the European Court of Human Rights